Alex Stephen Welsh (born 1 September 1988) is an English cricketer.  Welsh is a right-handed batsman who bowls slow left-arm orthodox.  He was born in Sheffield, Yorkshire.

While studying for his degree at Loughborough University, Welsh made his first-class debut for Loughborough MCCU against Kent in 2010.  He made a further first-class appearance in 2010, against Yorkshire.  His two first-class appearances saw him score 30 runs at an average of 15.00, with a high score of 21.  With the ball, he took 4 wickets at a bowling average of 38.00, with best figures of 3/32.

References

External links
Alex Welsh at ESPNcricinfo

1988 births
Living people
Cricketers from Sheffield
Alumni of Loughborough University
English cricketers
Loughborough MCCU cricketers
English cricketers of the 21st century